Aïn Témouchent District is a district of Aïn Témouchent Province, Algeria.

Municipalities 
The district is divided into 2 municipalities:
Aïn Témouchent
Sidi Ben Adda

References 

Districts of Aïn Témouchent Province